The Wendy's Championship for Children was an annual golf tournament for professional female golfers on the LPGA Tour from 1999 through 2006 in the Columbus, Ohio area. The tournament was played at the New Albany Country Club in New Albany, Ohio from 1999 to 2001. In 2002, it moved to Tartan Fields Golf Club in Dublin, Ohio.

Proceeds from the event benefited pediatric cancer research and treatment at the Columbus Children's Hospital. From 2000 to 2005, over $2.7 million was raised.

On August 31, 2006, corporate sponsor Wendy's announced that its relationship with the tournament had come to an end as a result of a disagreement between the corporation and the LPGA over future dates of the event.

The last tournament was held August 22–27, 2006.

Tournament names through the years:
1999-2000: New Albany Golf Classic
2001-2006: Wendy's Championship for Children

Winners

Tournament record

References

External links
Coverage on LPGA Tour's official site

Former LPGA Tour events
Golf in Ohio
Sports competitions in Columbus, Ohio
Sports in Dublin, Ohio
Sports competitions in Ohio
History of women in Ohio